Caroline Gabriela Medina Peschiutta (born June 27, 1992, in Maracay, Venezuela) is a Venezuelan beauty queen who won the titles of Teen Model Venezuela 2009, Miss Venezuela Earth 2010, Reina Hispanoamericana 2010 and Miss Earth - Fire 2011.

Beauty pageant competitions
Medina represented the state of Aragua in the national beauty pageant Miss Venezuela 2010, on October 28, 2010, and obtained the title of Miss Venezuela Earth 2010. She won as "Miss Earth - Fire" in the 2011 Miss Earth pageant in the Philippines. Medina won the 2010 Reina Hispanoamericana pageant, in Santa Cruz (Bolivia), on November 4, 2010. On August 6, 2009, Medina also won the "Teen Model Venezuela 2009" pageant in Caracas (Venezuela).

References

External links
Miss Venezuela Official Website
Miss Venezuela La Nueva Era MB

1992 births
Living people
Venezuelan beauty pageant winners
Miss Earth 2011 contestants
Venezuelan people of Italian descent